Winston Alfred English (born 13 September 1943) is a former Guyanese cricketer who played first-class cricket for Guyana from 1967 to 1970.

A middle-order batsman and fast bowler, English had a fine first-class debut when he took 4 for 111 against Barbados in the 1966–67 Shell Shield, including the wickets of the Test batsmen Seymour Nurse and Gary Sobers. He played in a team of young players for a West Indies President's XI in the opening first-class match of the English tour of the West Indies in 1967–68. He captained Guyana in the final match of the Shell Shield in 1968–69, scoring 112 and top-scoring for his team. He played as the professional for Haslingden in the Lancashire League in 1969 and 1970. After playing two more matches for Guyana in 1969–70 he went to live in the USA.

References

External links
 
 Winston English at CricketArchive
 Winston English at Guyana Cricket

1943 births
Living people
Sportspeople from Georgetown, Guyana
Guyanese cricketers
Guyana cricketers
D. H. Robins' XI cricketers